Small Crime is a 2008 Greek-German-Cypriot romantic crime comedy-drama film directed by , starring Aris Servetalis and .

Cast
 Aris Servetalis as Leonidas
  as Aggeliki
 Rania Oikonomidou as Anastasia Pleiades
 Antonis Katsaris as Zacharias
 Errikos Litsis as Iordanis
 Evangelia Andreadaki as Victoria
  as Antigone
  as Panagiotis
  as Mouzafer

Reception
Alissa Simon of Variety wrote that the film "humorously captures the mentality of a small island community."

Yolande Cole of The Georgia Straight wrote that Georgiou "draws memorable performances from both Servetalis and Papadopoulou, succeeding in producing a unique and charming comedy, set against the backdrop of a spectacular location."

References

External links
 

2008 films
2000s crime comedy-drama films
Greek romantic comedy-drama films
German romantic comedy-drama films
Greek crime drama films
German crime comedy-drama films
Cypriot drama films
2008 romantic comedy-drama films
2008 crime drama films
Cypriot comedy films
2000s Greek-language films